The pterygoid hamulus is a hook-like process at the lower extremity of the medial pterygoid plate of the sphenoid bone of the skull. It is the superior origin of the pterygomandibular raphe, and the levator veli palatini muscle.

Structure 
The pterygoid hamulus is part of the medial pterygoid plate of the sphenoid bone of the skull. Its tip is rounded off. It has an average length of 7.2 mm, an average depth of 1.4 mm, and an average width of 2.3 mm. The tendon of tensor veli palatini muscle glides around it.

Function 
The pterygoid hamulus is the superior origin of the pterygomandibular raphe. It is also the origin of levator veli palatini muscle.

Clinical significance 
Rarely, the pterygoid hamulus may be enlarged, which may cause mouth pain.

See also 
 Hamulus

References

External links 
 
 

Bones of the head and neck